Grace and St. Stephen's Episcopal Church is a church in Colorado Springs, Colorado.

Grace and St. Stephen's Episcopal Church was founded in 1923, when the then two parishes – Grace Church (founded in 1873) and St. Stephen's (founded in 1894) -- merged. The united church, under the leadership of the Rev. Arthur Taft, was established on the site of St. Stephen's, which today serves as the parish hall. The current Gothic Revival structure was designed by E. Donald Robb, principal of Boston-based architectural firm of Frohman, Robb and Little, designers of the National Cathedral in Washington, D.C.

See also
National Register of Historic Places listings in El Paso County, Colorado

External links

El Pomar Foundation Profile
Historical summary of Grace and St. Stephen's

Churches in Colorado Springs, Colorado
Churches in El Paso County, Colorado
Episcopal church buildings in Colorado
Churches completed in 1926
1926 establishments in Colorado
Churches on the National Register of Historic Places in Colorado
Churches in Colorado